Theodore 'Ted' Jay  Tomblin (born February 2, 1971 in Logan, West Virginia) is an American politician and a Democratic member of the West Virginia House of Delegates representing District 24 since January 12, 2013.

Education
Tomblin attended Marshall University.

Elections
2012 Redistricted to District 24, Tomblin ran in the May 8, 2012 Democratic Primary and placed second with 2,794 votes (25.1%), and placed first in the November 6, 2012 General election with 7,591 votes (52.6%) ahead of incumbent Democratic Representative Rupert Phillips.
2008 Initially in District 19, Tomblin ran in the twelve-way May 13, 2008 Democratic Primary but placed fifth; the top four went on to the November 4, 2008 General election.
2010 Tomblin ran in the eleven-way May 11, 2010 Democratic Primary but placed sixth; the top four went on to the six-way November 2, 2010 General election.

References

External links
Official page at the West Virginia Legislature

Ted Tomblin at Ballotpedia
Teddy (Ted) Tomblin at the National Institute on Money in State Politics

1971 births
Living people
Marshall University alumni
Democratic Party members of the West Virginia House of Delegates
People from Logan, West Virginia